WFLS-FM is a Country formatted broadcast radio station licensed to Fredericksburg, Virginia, serving Central Virginia, Northern Virginia, and Southern Maryland.  WFLS-FM is owned and operated by Alpha Media.

History
WFLS was founded, and initially owned and operated by, The Free Lance–Star newspaper. WFLS began broadcasting as an AM station (on 1350 AM), on July 15, 1960.

Adopting a middle-of-the-road format, WFLS-FM launched on June 12, 1962.  The station switched to an all-Country format in 1975. It started broadcasting in High-Definition in May 2006.  It started with the slogan "Virginia's Best Country", used until early 2006. Then "Real Country Variety" used from early 2006 to April 2, 2012, and has been using "Today's Country" since then.

On April 16, 2013, W243BS 96.5 dropped its simulcast of sister station WNTX for a simulcast of WFLS-HD2 carrying a Freeform format.  The "FredFM" format was dropped in early March 2014, when W243BS resumed simulcasting sister station WNTX.

On January 23, 2015, Alpha Media "entered into a definitive agreement" to purchase WFLS and sister stations WNTX, WVBX, and WWUZ from Free Lance-Star License, Inc. for an unknown sum.  The purchase was consummated on May 1, 2015, at a price of $8.1 million.

References

External links
 93.3 WFLS Online
 

1962 establishments in Virginia
FLS-FM
Radio stations established in 1962
Alpha Media radio stations